If A Song Could Get Me You is a compilation album by Norwegian singer-songwriter Marit Larsen, released on 14 August 2009. The album was released through Sony Music Entertainment, after Larsen signed a contract with them for worldwide distribution of her albums outside of Norway, where she has been contracted to EMI for several years. The album was originally catered for the German market, where her previous two albums had not been released, after the success of lead single "If a Song Could Get Me You" in the country. The album was announced on Marit Larsen's YouTube page and Maritlarsen.de. The album consists of her songs from her previous two albums Under the Surface and The Chase. In Brazil a different version was released in December 2010.

Track listing

Singles

Charts

Weekly charts

Year-end charts

Certifications

|-

References

Marit Larsen albums
2009 compilation albums